Ian MacDonald Campbell, CVO, FREng, FICE, FCIT (13 July 1922 – 1 April 1994) was a British civil engineer. He served as chief executive of the British Railways Board (1978–80) and chairman of the Scottish Board of British Railways (1983–88).

Early life, family and education
Ian MacDonald Campbell was born on 13 July 1922, the son of John Isdale Campbell. He attended University College London, graduating with a Bachelor of Science degree in engineering in 1942.

Career

Railways 
After graduating, Campbell was employed by the London, Midland and Scottish Railway, and then served in the Royal Air Force during the Second World War. On demobilisation, in 1947 Campbell began working for British Railways; he was employed in engineering design and construction. In 1952, he spent a year in the United States studying management technology. He co-wrote an account of his experience in the US which was published in the Institution of Civil Engineers's proceedings in 1954. After returning to the United Kingdom in 1953, he was appointed assistant district engineer, Sheffield; he was later promoted to be district engineer at Kings Cross, and then in 1963 assistant civil engineer for the Scottish Region.

In 1965, Campbell was appointed chief civil engineer for the Scottish Region of British Railways. He was appointed assistant general manager of the London Midland Region in 1968 and general manager of the Eastern Region in 1970, serving until 1973 when he became an executive director of British Rail. In 1977, he became a member of the British Railways Board (BRB) with responsibility for engineering and research, and was appointed chief executive in June 1978, taking over from David Bowick. He was replaced as CEO by Bob Reid in March 1980. Thereafter, he was vice-chairman of the board from March 1980 until January 1983. He then served as chairman of the Scottish Board from 1983 to 1988, and left the BRB in 1987.

Other appointments and honours 
In addition to his career with British Rail, Campbell was a member of the European Economic Community's Economic and Social Committee between 1983 and 1990. He was also a member of the British Army's Territorial & Army Volunteer Reserve's Engineer and Railway Staff Corps, an unpaid, volunteer unit that provides technical expertise to the armed forces. With the serial number 485885, he was initially a major; his promotion to lieutenant colonel was gazetted on 3 May 1970, to colonel on 1 August 1974. and to be Colonel Commanding the Engineer and Railway Staff Corps on 21 July 1981. His supernumeracy to establishment was dated 30 April 1986 and Col. Christopher Terrel Wyatt took command of the corps.

He was also vice-president (1978–81) and then president (1981–82) of the Institution of Civil Engineers. Campbell was appointed an Officer (Brother) of the Order of St John of Jerusalem in 1973. He was also appointed a Commander of the Royal Victorian Order (CVO) in the 1977 Silver Jubilee and Birthday Honours. He was elected a fellow of the Royal Academy of Engineering (FREng) in 1980, and was also a fellow of the Institution of Civil Engineers (FICE) and the Chartered Institute of Transport (FCIT).

Later life 
Campbell died on 1 April 1994. He was survived by his wife, Hilda Ann (née Williams), and their son and three daughters.

References

Bibliography 
;
 Terence Richard (Terry) Gourvish, British Rail: 1974–97: From Integration to Privatisation, Oxford University Press, Oxford, 2002. . (705 pages);

        
        
        
        
        
        

1922 births
1994 deaths
British civil engineers
Scottish civil engineers
Presidents of the Institution of Civil Engineers
Commanders of the Royal Victorian Order
Engineers from Edinburgh
British Rail people
Engineer and Railway Staff Corps officers
Alumni of University College London
Royal Air Force personnel of World War II